Independent Patriotic Legion (in Spanish: Legión Patriótica Independiente), was a political party in Peru, founded in 1944, in order to launch the presidential campaign of Eloy G. Ureta.

References

Defunct political parties in Peru
Political parties established in 1944
Political parties with year of disestablishment missing